Leila Ida Nerissa Bathurst Waddell, also known as Laylah, (10 August 1880 – 13 September 1932), born Leila Ida Bathurst Waddell, was a violinist who became a famed Scarlet Woman of Aleister Crowley, and a powerful historical figure in magick and Thelema in her own right. While biographer Toby Creswell posited that Leila was part-Maori, he provides no evidence of this; in fact NSW birth deaths and marriages records show she was the granddaughter of John Crane (Coventry, England) and Janet McKenzie (Fort William, Inverness-shire, Scotland) and John Waddell and Elizabeth McAnally (both of County Monaghan, Ireland).

Musician 
Leila Ida Bathurst Waddell was born in Bathurst, New South Wales, the daughter of Mr. and Mrs. David Waddell.

She began her professional career as a violin teacher at Presbyterian Ladies' College, Croydon, and Ascham and Kambala schools.

In 1908, Waddell was a member of the gypsy band in A Waltz Dream at Daly's London Theatre. It was while in London that she met Aleister Crowley.  They studied the occult and took mescaline together.

Crowley's muse 
She was familiarly addressed by Crowley as "Laylah," and was immortalised in his 1912 volume The Book of Lies and his autobiography The Confessions of Aleister Crowley. Crowley referred to her, variously, as "Divine Whore", "Mother of Heaven", "Sister Cybele", "Scarlet Woman", and "Whore of Babylon". His Book of Lies was largely dedicated to Waddell, with poems like "Duck Billed Platypus" and "Waratah Blossoms". A photograph of her in ritual is reproduced in the volume.

Waddell herself was an accomplished writer, magician. In October and November 1910, Crowley starred Waddell and other members of his magical order the Argenteum Astrum in his series of dramatic planetary-based magical rites, the Rites of Eleusis, at London's Caxton Hall.

In 1912, Waddell, and fellow Crowley students Mary Desti and Mary Butts, were given co-authorship credit on Crowley's Magick (Book 4) as they wrote down his words, helped shape them by asking defining questions, and elicited Crowley's commentary on pertinent points.

Crowley also starred Waddell, along with other 'fiddlers', in a septette called "The Ragged Ragtime Girls" on the London stage. This vaudeville troupe also toured Europe, the US and Russia, promoted by Crowley.

Laylah was probably Aleister Crowley's most powerful muse, as she inspired numerous poems in addition to numerous chapters in The Book of Lies. Crowley based two of his short stories on Leila – "The Vixen" and "The Violinist".

In 1915, Crowley stood at the base of the Statue of Liberty and declared an Irish Republic in a long and impassioned speech accompanied by Waddell on the violin. The relationship with Crowley disintegrated as a consequence of his infidelities.

Later life 
In 1923, Waddell returned to Sydney to nurse her ailing father. She performed with JC Williamson Ltd Orchestra at Her Majesty's Theatre and the Criterion, and with the Conservatorium and Philharmonic Societies Orchestras. In between times she resumed teaching, this time at the Convent School of the Sacred Heart in Sydney's Elizabeth Bay.

She died, unmarried, of cancer at age 52.  The Sydney Morning Herald noted: "Besides possessing an excellent technique, Miss Waddell's style as a violinist was particularly marked by charm and refinement."

See also 
 List of occultists
 List of works by Aleister Crowley
 Libri of Aleister Crowley
 Sex magic

References

External links 
"Leila Waddell recognised at Bathurst 200 Celebration"

1880 births
1932 deaths
20th-century violinists
20th-century women musicians
Australian Thelemites
Australian people of Irish descent
Muses
People educated at Ascham School
People from Bathurst, New South Wales
Women violinists